The AFF U-16 Championship is an annual international football competition contested by the national teams of the members of the ASEAN Football Federation (AFF) and occasionally invited nations from the rest of Asia. The tournament used to be played at under-17 level, however the AFF followed the lead of the Asian Football Confederation after they renamed its U-17 competition to fall in line with FIFA's naming conventions and also to reflect the age of the players at the competition. The competition was first held in 2002 and resumed in 2005.

Summary

Performance by country

Participating nations 

Legend

  — Champions
  — Runners-up
  — Third place
  — Fourth place

 GS — Group stage
 q — Qualified for the current tournament
  — Did not enter / Withdrew / Banned
  — Hosts

All-time ranking table

See also 
 AFC U-17 Asian Cup
 AFF U-19 Youth Championship
 AFF Championship
 Football at the Southeast Asian Games
 ASEAN Football Federation

References

External links 
  at ASEAN Football Federation official website.

 
AFF competitions
Under-16 association football
Recurring sporting events established in 2002
2002 establishments in Southeast Asia
Annual sporting events